Stanley Kazmierczak Keyes,  (born May 17, 1953 in Hamilton, Ontario) is a Canadian diplomat and former politician.

Before politics
Before entering politics, Keyes was a television news reporter from 1973 to 1988. He covered local news in Hamilton, Ontario, Queen’s Park, Toronto and Parliament Hill, Ottawa.

Political career
Keyes was first elected to the House of Commons in 1988 election as the Liberal Party of Canada Member of Parliament for Hamilton West. He was subsequently reelected in 1993, 1997 and 2000 elections. In 2003, he was appointed Minister of National Revenue, Minister of State (Sport), Minister Responsible for the Canada Post Corporation and Minister Responsible for the Royal Canadian Mint.  Keyes served as Parliamentary Secretary to the Minister of Transport from February 1996 to July 1998.

During the 2004 election, he ran as the Liberal candidate for the redistributed riding of Hamilton Centre, but was defeated by the New Democratic Party candidate David Christopherson, a former provincial cabinet minister.

For two years between 2002 and 2004, Keyes was Chair of the National Liberal Caucus and Chair of the National Liberal Caucus Executive Committee.  Previously, he served as Chair of the House of Commons Standing Committee on Transport and Chair of the House of Commons Liaison Committee. From 1988 to 2003, Keyes was a member of the House of Commons Standing Committee on Industry, Standing Committee on Transport and the Standing Committee on Foreign Affairs and International Trade. He also led Government of Canada Task Forces on High Speed Rail, Airports, and the Canadian Sports System. His leadership on the Ports and Harbours Task Force earned him the American Association of Port Authorities (AAPA) Port Person of the Year Award, the first Canadian to be so honoured.

On August 2, 2005, Keyes was appointed Canadian consul general to Boston. The Conservative government of Stephen Harper replaced Keyes as Canada's representative in Boston on July 13, 2006, with Neil LeBlanc, a former Nova Scotia Tory finance minister and leadership candidate.

After politics
On October 16, 2006, Keyes became the new President of the Canadian Payday Loan Association. He retired on April 17, 2016.

In November 2015, the Province of Ontario appointed Keyes to the Hamilton Port Authority Board of Directors.

In January 2017, Keyes was selected to serve on the Board of Directors of John C. Munro Hamilton International Airport.

Personal life
Keyes is married to Catherine. They have two daughters, Caitlin and Hillary.

Electoral record

References

1953 births
Canadian diplomats
Canadian people of Polish descent
Members of the Cabinet of Canada
Liberal Party of Canada MPs
Living people
Members of the House of Commons of Canada from Ontario
Members of the King's Privy Council for Canada
Politicians from Hamilton, Ontario
Members of the 27th Canadian Ministry